Sir Spencer Le Marchant (15 January 1931 – 7 September 1986) was a British Conservative Party politician.

Early life
Born in Edmonton, London, Le Marchant was educated at Eton College and was a member of the London Stock Exchange. He served as a councillor on Westminster City Council from 1956.

Political career
Le Marchant unsuccessfully contested Vauxhall, a London safe seat held by the Labour Party's George Strauss since its formation in 1950, at the 1966 general election. He was elected to the House of Commons as Member of Parliament for the marginal Derbyshire constituency of High Peak at the 1970 general election, and held the seat until he retired from Parliament at the 1983 general election.  He was appointed Comptroller of the Household when Margaret Thatcher came to power in 1979.

Le Marchant received note in Thatcher's memoirs as "famous for his intake of champagne", 6 foot and 6 inches tall, and "could be heard booming out the result" when the then Labour government lost a motion of confidence by one vote, causing the 1979 general election.

Later life
Le Marchant retired from the House of Commons at the 1983 general election, and died at the age of 55 in 1986 on the Isle of Wight.

Personal life
In 1955 he married Lucinda Gaye Leveson-Gower, daughter of Brigadier General Hugh Nugent Leveson-Gower, RA and his first wife, Avril Joy Mullens (later fourth wife of Ernest Aldrich Simpson, himself the second husband of Wallis, Duchess of Windsor, whose love affair with King Edward VIII led to the 1936 abdication crisis).

In 2006, Michael Brown, a former Conservative MP from 1979 to 1997, stated that Le Marchant had tried unsuccessfully to seduce him.

References

Times Guide to the House of Commons, 1966 and 1979
Margaret Thatcher, The Downing Street Years (1993)

Who's Who 1987

External links 
 

1931 births
1986 deaths
Conservative Party (UK) MPs for English constituencies
Councillors in Greater London
People educated at Eton College
Members of the Parliament of the United Kingdom for constituencies in Derbyshire
Knights Bachelor
Politicians awarded knighthoods
UK MPs 1970–1974
UK MPs 1974
UK MPs 1974–1979
UK MPs 1979–1983
English LGBT politicians
LGBT members of the Parliament of the United Kingdom
High Peak, Derbyshire
20th-century English LGBT people
Conservative Party (UK) councillors
Councillors in the City of Westminster